The 2010 Red Bull MotoGP Rookies Cup season was the fourth season of the Red Bull MotoGP Rookies Cup. The season began on May 1 at Circuito de Jerez and ended at the Misano World Circuit on September 4, after ten races.

Jacob Gagne was champion, securing the championship with a second-place finish in the final round at Misano.

Calendar
The double header at the Czech Republic Grand Prix in Brno moved to the penultimate event of the season, with six European GPs seeing races, four of which being double headers.

Entry list
Notes
All Entrants were riding a KTM
Tyres were supplied by Dunlop

Season standings

Scoring system
Points are awarded to the top fifteen finishers. Rider has to finish the race to earn points.

Riders' standings

References

External links
 Official Site
 Season at FIM-Website

Red Bull MotoGP Rookies Cup
Red Bull MotoGP Rookies Cup racing seasons